The following low-power television stations broadcast on digital or analog channel 31 in the United States:

 K18DN-D in Kanab, Utah
 K31AD-D in Victorville, etc., California
 K31AE-D in Sutherlin, Oregon
 K31AH-D in Omak, etc., Washington
 K31BI-D in Kingman, Arizona
 K31BM-D in Silver Springs, Nevada
 K31CI-D in Montpelier, Idaho
 K31CR-D in Prineville, etc., Oregon
 K31CT-D in Cortez, Colorado
 K31CW-D in Carbondale, Colorado
 K31DC-D in Freedom, Wyoming
 K31DR-D in Caballo, New Mexico
 K31DS-D in Coolin, Idaho
 K31EA-D in Littlefield, Arizona
 K31EF-D in Frost, Minnesota
 K31EI-D in Cedar Canyon, Utah
 K31EL-D in Tropic, etc., Utah
 K31EO-D in Mora, New Mexico
 K31FD-D in Boise, Idaho
 K31FN-D in Manti & Ephraim, Utah
 K31FP-D in Heber/Midway, Utah
 K31FQ-D in Park City, Utah
 K31FR-D in Preston, Idaho
 K31FU-D in Golconda, Nevada
 K31FV-D in Durango & Hermosa, Colorado
 K31FW-D in Lyman, Wyoming
 K31FZ-D in Haxtun, Colorado
 K31GH-D in Hayward, Wisconsin
 K31GJ-D in Alamogordo, New Mexico
 K31GN-D in La Grande, Oregon
 K31GP-D in Brookings, etc., Oregon
 K31GS-D in Roswell, New Mexico
 K31GZ-D in Lake Havasu City, Arizona
 K31HB-D in Gallina, New Mexico
 K31HC-D in Quanah, Texas
 K31HK-D in Rainier, Oregon
 K31HO-D in Shreveport, Louisiana
 K31HS-D in Malad, Idaho
 K31HY-D in Needles, etc., California
 K31HZ-D in The Dalles, etc., Oregon
 K31IE-D in Susanville, etc., California
 K31IF-D in Hagerman, Idaho
 K31IH-D in Wray, Colorado
 K31IQ-D in Sterling, Colorado
 K31IR-D in Grays River, Washington
 K31IS-D in Toquerville, Utah
 K31IU-D in Morgan, etc., Utah
 K31IV-D in Romeo, Colorado
 K31IW-D in Ridgway, Colorado
 K31IX-D in Salida, Colorado
 K31IZ-D in Naalehu, Hawaii
 K31JB-D in Hanna, etc., Utah
 K31JC-D in Duchesne, Utah
 K31JE-D in Escalante, Utah
 K31JF-D in Boulder, Utah
 K31JL-D in Vernal, etc., Utah
 K31JN-D in Scofield, Utah
 K31JO-D in Wood River, etc., Wyoming
 K31JP-D in Manila, etc., Utah
 K31JQ-D in Woodward, etc., Oklahoma
 K31JR-D in Thoreau, New Mexico
 K31JW-D in Elk City, Oklahoma
 K31JX-D in Rockville, Utah
 K31KB-D in Deming, New Mexico
 K31KC-D in Coalville & adjacent area, Utah
 K31KE-D in San Luis Obispo, etc., California
 K31KH-D in Stateline, Nevada
 K31KJ-D in Big Springs, Texas
 K31KK-D in Kingsville-Alice, Texas
 K31KL-D in Walla Walla, Washington
 K31KN-D in Caineville, Utah
 K31KP-D in Alton, Utah
 K31KQ-D in Plains, Montana
 K31KS-D in Lechee, etc., Arizona
 K31KT-D in Moses Lake, Washington
 K31KV-D in St. James, Minnesota
 K31KW-D in Richland, Washington
 K31KZ-D in Lakeview, Oregon
 K31LA-D in Fremont, Utah
 K31LC-D in Nephi, Utah
 K31LE-D in Bridger, etc., Montana
 K31LF-D in Clareton, Wyoming
 K31LG-D in Emery, Utah
 K31LH-D in Fishlake Resort, Utah
 K31LL-D in Midland/Odessa, Texas
 K31LO-D in Eureka, Nevada
 K31MA-D in Big Falls, Minnesota
 K31MB-D in Ridgecrest, California
 K31MC-D in Spring Glen, etc., Utah
 K31MD-D in Kasilof, Alaska
 K31MJ-D in Four Buttes, etc., Montana
 K31MK-D in Lawton, Oklahoma
 K31MP-D in Grand Forks, North Dakota
 K31MU-D in Lingleville-Crowley, Texas, to move to channel 7
 K31NA-D in Altus, Oklahoma
 K31NB-D in Santa Fe, New Mexico
 K31ND-D in Oroville, California
 K31NE-D in Williams, Arizona
 K31NF-D in Verde Valley, etc., Arizona
 K31NH-D in Klamath Falls, Oregon
 K31NI-D in Lamar, Colorado
 K31NJ-D in Lansing, Iowa
 K31NK-D in Peoa, Oakley, Utah
 K31NO-D in Bend, Oregon
 K31NP-D in Rural Garfield County, Utah
 K31NR-D in Overton, Nevada
 K31NT-D in Jackson, Minnesota
 K31NU-D in Hanksville, Utah
 K31NV-D in Globe-Miami, Arizona
 K31NW-D in Forsyth, Montana
 K31NX-D in Fountain Green, Utah
 K31NZ-D in Eagle Nest, New Mexico
 K31OB-D in Randolph, Utah
 K31OC-D in Broken Bow, Nebraska
 K31OD-D in Henefer, etc., Utah
 K31OE-D in Dove Creek, etc., Colorado
 K31OG-D in Parowan, Enoch, etc., Utah
 K31OH-D in Mesa, Colorado
 K31OI-D in Beryl, Modena etc., Utah
 K31OJ-D in Delta, etc., Utah
 K31OK-D in Beaver, etc., Utah
 K31OL-D in Salinas, California
 K31OM-D in Garrison, etc., Utah
 K31ON-D in Fillmore, etc., Utah
 K31OO-D in Green River, Utah
 K31OQ-D in Grants Pass, Oregon
 K31OR-D in Olivia, Minnesota
 K31OS-D in Ferron, Utah
 K31OT-D in Clear Creek, Utah
 K31OV-D in Clarendon, Texas
 K31OX-D in Ramah, New Mexico
 K31OY-D in Pahrump, Nevada
 K31PA-D in Dolan Springs, Arizona
 K31PC-D in Yuma, Colorado
 K31PD-D in Whitefish, etc., Montana
 K31PH-D in Crested Butte, Colorado
 K31PI-D in London Springs, Oregon
 K31PJ-D in Holbrook, Idaho
 K31PK-D in Birchdale, Minnesota
 K31PM-D in Farmington, New Mexico
 K31PO-D in Des Moines, Iowa
 K31PP-D in Sioux City, Iowa
 K31PR-D in Tyler, Texas
 K31PS-D in Lakeshore, California
 K31PT-D in Soda Springs, Idaho
 K31PY-D in Roundup, Montana
 K31PZ-D in Clarksville, Arkansas
 K31QA-D in Deadwood, South Dakota
 K42IX-D in Antimony, Utah
 K47CY-D in Fort Peck, Montana
 KAAS-LP in Garden City, Kansas
 KAGN-CD in Crowley, Louisiana
 KBAB-LD in Santa Barbara, California
 KBTF-CD in Bakersfield, California
 KBVO-CD in Austin, Texas, an ATSC 3.0 station
 KCSG-LD in Ogden, Utah
 KEOT-LD in Abilene, Texas
 KEUV-LD in Eureka, California
 KEVE-LD in Vancouver, Washington
 KFMS-LD in Sacramento, California
 KLDY-LD in Anchorage, Alaska
 KMNZ-LD in Coeur D'Alene, Idaho
 KNOV-CD in New Orleans, Louisiana
 KOHC-CD in Oklahoma City, Oklahoma
 KPJO-LD in Pittsburg, Kansas
 KPTP-LD in Norfolk, Nebraska
 KRET-CD in Palm Springs, California
 KSDY-LD in San Diego, California
 KTFF-LD in Fresno, California
 KVDF-CD in San Antonio, Texas
 KWNL-CD in Winslow, Arkansas
 KXOF-CD in Laredo, Texas
 KXOK-LD in Enid, Oklahoma
 W31AN-D in Murphy, North Carolina
 W31DC-D in Fort Pierce, Florida
 W31DH-D in Franklin, etc., North Carolina
 W31DI-D in Spruce Pine, North Carolina
 W31DV-D in Guayama, Puerto Rico
 W31EG-D in Tampa, Florida
 W31EH-D in Springfield, Illinois
 W31EJ-D in Tutu, St Thomas, U.S. Virgin Islands
 W31EL-D in Baton Rouge, Louisiana
 W31EP-D in Panama City, Florida
 W31EU-D in Columbus, Georgia
 W31EV-D in Wausau, Wisconsin
 W31EX-D in Bangor, Maine
 W31EZ-D in Chicago, Illinois, uses WESV-LD's spectrum
 W31FA-D in Elmhurst, Michigan
 W31FD-D in Bluffton-Hilton Head, South Carolina
 W31FE-D in Savannah, Georgia
 W31FF-D in Maple Valley, Michigan
 WAHU-LD in Crozet, Virginia
 WAXC-LD in Alexander City, Alabama
 WESV-LD in Chicago, Illinois
 WFDY-LD in Myrtle Beach, South Carolina
 WHTV-LD in New York, New York
 WIIC-LD in Pittsburgh, Pennsylvania, to move to channel 10
 WJNI-LD in North Charleston, South Carolina
 WLEK-LD in Concord, New Hampshire
 WLHY-LD in Lebanon-Harrisburg-York-Lancaster, Pennsylvania
 WMBP-LD in Mobile, Alabama
 WMKG-CD in Muskegon, Michigan
 WMUB-LD in Warner Robins, Georgia
 WNCE-CD in Glens Falls, New York
 WODH-LD in Jacksonville, Florida
 WQDE-LD in Indianapolis, Indiana
 WRDM-CD in Hartford, Connecticut, uses WVIT's full-power spectrum
 WSCF-LD in Melbourne, Florida
 WSFG-LD in Berry, Alabama
 WTBL-LD in Pascagoula, Mississippi
 WTMO-CD in Orlando, Florida
 WTWL-LD in Wilmington, North Carolina
 WTZP-LD in Portsmouth, Ohio
 WWHL-LD in Nashville, Tennessee
 WZPK-LD in Highland, New York

The following low-power stations, which are no longer licensed, formerly broadcast on digital or analog channel 31:
 K31AG in English Bay, Alaska
 K31AK in Ellensburg, etc., Washington
 K31BW in Manhattan, Kansas
 K31BZ-D in Wellington, Texas
 K31CD-D in Canadian, Texas
 K31DB in Bluebell, etc., Utah
 K31FE in Blythe, California
 K31FG in Delta, etc., Utah
 K31FX in Pie Town & Quemado, New Mexico
 K31GC-D in Forrest, New Mexico
 K31GK-D in Ukiah, California
 K31HG in Wanship, Utah
 K31HH in Samak, Utah
 K31HQ in Lordsburg, New Mexico
 K31HT in Casper, Wyoming
 K31IA in Great Falls, Montana
 K31JA-D in Fruitland, Utah
 K31KI-D in Round Mountain, Nevada
 K31KR-D in Three Forks, Montana
 K31KU-D in Rapid City, South Dakota
 K31LB in Elko, Nevada
 K31LZ in Camp Verde, Arizona
 K31MX-D in Plainview, Texas
 K31PF-D in Weed, California
 K31PG-D in Granite Falls, Minnesota
 KBLI-LD in Lincoln, Nebraska
 KGFZ-LD in Yakima, etc., Washington
 KVHM-LP in Victoria, Texas
 KWEM-LP in Stillwater, Oklahoma
 W31BP in Burlington, etc., New York
 W31CQ in Elkins, West Virginia
 W31CX in Bangor, Maine
 W31CZ-D in Tampa, Florida
 W31DL-D in Ponce, Puerto Rico
 W31DZ-D in Clarksdale, Mississippi
 WDDM-LD in Tallahassee, Florida
 WKOG-LP in Indianapolis, Indiana
 WNAL-LD in Scottsboro, Alabama
 WTVK-LP in Key West, Florida
 WUDJ-LD in Crozet, Virginia
 WUDP-LD in Lafayette, Indiana
 WWBP-LP in Freedom, Pennsylvania

References

31 low-power